Gettysburg is a 1993 American epic war film about the Battle of Gettysburg in the American Civil War. Written and directed by Ronald F. Maxwell, the film was adapted from the 1974 historical novel The Killer Angels by Michael Shaara. It features an ensemble cast, including Tom Berenger as James Longstreet, Jeff Daniels as Joshua Chamberlain, Martin Sheen as Robert E. Lee, Stephen Lang as George Pickett, and Sam Elliott as John Buford.

Originally filmed as a miniseries for TNT, Gettysburg received a limited theatrical release from New Line Cinema under the direction of Ted Turner, who owned both entities. At 254 minutes (4 hours and 14 minutes), it is one of the longest films released by a major film studio in the United States. It received positive reviews from critics, but grossed only $12.7 million on a $20 million budget. It was  however considered a hit regardless, due to its immediate TNT premiere ratings success, and subsequent home video sales. A prequel entitled Gods and Generals was released in 2003, also directed by Maxwell and featuring many returning cast members.

Plot
The film begins with a narrated map showing the Confederate Army of Northern Virginia, commanded by Robert E. Lee, crossing the Potomac River to invade the North in June 1863, marching across Maryland and into Pennsylvania. On June 30, Confederate spy Henry Thomas Harrison reports to Lt. Gen. James Longstreet, commander of the First Corps, that the Union Army of the Potomac is moving in their direction, and that Union commander Joseph Hooker has been replaced by George Meade. Longstreet reports the information to General Lee, who is concerned that the army is moving "on the word of an actor", as opposed to that of his cavalry chief, J. E. B. Stuart. Nonetheless, Lee orders the army to concentrate near the town of Gettysburg. At the Union encampments near Union Mills, Maryland, Col. Joshua Lawrence Chamberlain of the 20th Maine is ordered to take in 120 men from the disbanded 2nd Maine who had resigned in protest, with permission to shoot any man who refuses to fight. Chamberlain speaks to the men, and is able to persuade all but six to take up arms.

In Gettysburg, Brig. Gen. John Buford and his cavalry division spot elements of Henry Heth's division of A. P. Hill's Third Corps approaching the town and recognizes that the main body of the Confederate army is approaching.  Buford recognizes that, with precedent from previous battles, the Confederates will arrive at Gettysburg first and entrench in strong positions, forcing the Union to charge them and suffer heavy casualties.  To prevent this, he opts to stand and fight where he is, judging the terrain to be "lovely ground" for slowing the Confederate advance. Buford sends word to I Corps commander Maj. Gen. John F. Reynolds to bring up reinforcements. Heth's troops engage Buford's cavalry the following morning, July 1, with Richard S. Ewell's Second Corps moving in to flank them. Reynolds brings his corps forward, but is killed by a Confederate sharpshooter. The Union army is pushed out of Gettysburg to Cemetery Ridge, and Lee—rejecting Longstreet's suggestion to redeploy south of Gettysburg and go on the defensive—orders Ewell to take the Union position "if practicable". However, Ewell hesitates and does not engage. The armies concentrate at their chosen positions for the remainder of the first day. At Confederate headquarters at Seminary Ridge, Maj. Gen. Isaac R. Trimble angrily denounces Ewell's inaction to Lee, and requests another assignment.

On the second day, July 2, Col. Strong Vincent's brigade from the Union V Corps is deployed to Little Round Top, and Vincent places the 20th Maine at the end of the line, warning Chamberlain that he and his regiment are the flank, and that if they retreat, the Confederate army can swing around behind them and rout the Union forces. Lee orders Longstreet to deploy his two available divisions to take Little Round Top and the neighboring Big Round Top. As Longstreet's corps deploys, Maj. Gen. John Bell Hood, commanding one of the divisions, protests to Longstreet; with the Union holding the high ground, he would lose half his forces if he attacked as ordered. Longstreet, despite his own protests to Lee, orders Hood to attack; Hood is later wounded fighting at Devil's Den. At the summit of Little Round Top, Chamberlain and the 20th Maine fight off wave after wave of advancing Confederates, and begin running out of ammunition. Colonel Vincent is mortally wounded, and none of the other three regiments in his brigade are able to provide support. Chamberlain orders his men to fix bayonets, and charge in a right wheel down the slope against the attacking Confederates, which Chamberlain describes as "we'll swing it down; we swing like a door." The attack successfully drives the Confederate assault back, and the Union flank holds. That evening, Stuart finally arrives, and Lee reprimands him for his being out of contact. At the same time, Longstreet's remaining division, under Maj. Gen. George Pickett, arrives on the field.

For the third day, July 3, Lee decides to send three divisions—Pickett's, Trimble's, and J. Johnston Pettigrew's—to attack the center of the Union line at Cemetery Ridge. Longstreet expresses his belief to Lee that the attack will fail, as the movement is a mile over open ground, and that the Union II Corps under Maj. Gen. Winfield Scott Hancock is deployed behind a stone wall, just as Longstreet's men had been at Fredericksburg. Lee nonetheless orders the attack to proceed. Longstreet then meets with the three division commanders and details the plan, beginning first with Colonel Edward Porter Alexander's artillery clearing the Union guns off the ridge, before deploying the men forward. Despite heavy Confederate fire, Alexander is unable to make an impact upon the Union guns. When Pickett asks to move forward, Longstreet simply nods. The Confederate divisions march across the open field, and Hancock is wounded as he commands from the front line. One of Pickett's brigades, commanded by Brig. Gen. Lewis Armistead, makes it over the stone wall, but Armistead is wounded and captured by Union troops. The Confederates retreat due to high casualties. Seeing a despondent General Pickett, General Lee implores him to "See to his division" to which Picket replies "General Lee, I have no division": Pickett's Charge ultimately fails. Meeting with Longstreet that evening, Lee finally decides that they will withdraw. The film ends with the fates of the major figures of the battle.

Cast

Confederate
 Tom Berenger as Lieutenant General James Longstreet
 Martin Sheen as General Robert E. Lee
 Stephen Lang as Major General George Pickett
 Richard Jordan as Brigadier General Lewis Armistead
 Andrew Prine as Brigadier General Richard B. Garnett
 Cooper Huckabee as Henry Thomas Harrison
 Patrick Gorman as Major General John Bell Hood
 Bo Brinkman as Major Walter H. Taylor
 James Lancaster as Lieutenant Colonel Arthur Fremantle
 W. Morgan Sheppard as Major General Isaac R. Trimble
 Kieran Mulroney as Major Moxley Sorrel
 James Patrick Stuart as Colonel Edward Porter Alexander
 Tim Ruddy as Major Charles Marshall
 Royce D. Applegate as Brigadier General James L. Kemper
 Ivan Kane as Captain T. J. Goree
 Warren Burton as Major General Henry Heth
 MacIntyre Dixon as Major General Jubal Early
 Joseph Fuqua as Major General J. E. B. Stuart
 Tim Scott as Lieutenant General Richard S. Ewell
 George Lazenby as Brigadier General J. Johnston Pettigrew
 Graham Winton as Major General Robert E. Rodes

Ted Turner, the owner of the film's production company Turner Pictures, has an uncredited appearance as Colonel Waller T. Patton.

Union
 Jeff Daniels as Colonel Joshua Chamberlain
 Sam Elliott as Brigadier General John Buford
 C. Thomas Howell as Lieutenant Thomas Chamberlain
 Kevin Conway as Sergeant Buster Kilrain
 Brian Mallon as Major General Winfield Scott Hancock
 Buck Taylor as Colonel William Gamble
 John Diehl as Private Joseph Bucklin
 Joshua D. Maurer as Colonel James Clay Rice
 John Rothman as Major General John F. Reynolds
 Richard Anderson as Major General George Meade
 Billy Campbell as Lieutenant Andrew Lewis Pitzer
 David Carpenter as Colonel Thomas C. Devin
 Maxwell Caulfield as Colonel Strong Vincent
 Donal Logue as Captain Ellis Spear
 Dwier Brown as Captain Brewer
 Herb Mitchell as Sergeant Andrew J. Tozier
 Emile O. Schmidt as Brigadier General John Gibbon

Ken Burns, who wrote and directed the 1990 documentary The Civil War, portrays an aide to Hancock. Civil War historian Brian Pohanka makes an uncredited appearance as Brigadier General Alexander S. Webb. The character Sergeant Owen is portrayed by Mark Moses. Matt Letscher, who would later appear in the 2003 prequel Gods and Generals as Colonel Adelbert Ames, makes his film debut as a 2nd Maine soldier.

Production
Reeves Teletape Studios first acquired the rights for an adaptation of The Killer Angels in 1978. In 1981, Ronald F. Maxwell acquired the rights to the property and hired Michael Sharaa to write a screenplay adaptation. Although Sharaa died in 1988, Maxwell completed the 400-page screenplay. PolyGram Pictures agreed to produce the project as a film starring Robert Duvall and William Hurt but went bankrupt shortly afterwards. Maxwell was unable to sell the project to any other studio because of the failures of recent historical epics such as Heaven's Gate and Revolution. Kevin Costner was interested in adapting the film but chose instead to direct Dances with Wolves.

Although Maxwell was displeased with American Civil War television series such as North and South and The Blue and the Gray, he reluctantly decided to try to release the project as a television series. The producers originally pitched the project to ABC in 1991, as a TV miniseries. ABC initially agreed to back the project, but when a miniseries about George Armstrong Custer, Son of the Morning Star (1991), got low ratings and after the Gulf War started, ABC pulled out. Maxwell, with help from documentarian Ken Burns, finally secured funding for the film from Ted Turner at the 3rd Golden Laurel Awards in 1991. Originally it was planned as a miniseries for Turner Network Television, but it was released as a film instead.

Duvall decided against starring as Robert E. Lee in order to appear in Stalin, while Albert Finney and George C. Scott declined the role.

For the first time, the National Park Service allowed the motion picture industry to recreate and film battle scenes directly on the Gettysburg Battlefield, including scenes of Devil's Den and Little Round Top. However, much of the movie was shot at a nearby Adams County farm. Thousands of Civil War reenactors from across the country volunteered their time to come to Gettysburg to participate in the massive battle scenes.

The score was composed by Randy Edelman.

During filming of the battle scenes on Little Round Top, Bradley Egen, an extra playing a Union soldier, was unintentionally struck in the head by the butt of a musket and suffered a mild concussion, however Bradley was able to resume light duties the following day.

Soundtrack
The soundtrack was composed by Randy Edelman and issued on Milan Records.

Two more soundtracks, More Songs and Music From Gettysburg and a Deluxe Commemorative Edition, were released as well. The first one included popular songs from the time period and a recitation of the Gettysburg Address by Jeff Daniels, while the second featured the original soundtrack album (above) and a second disc  several previously unreleased tracks from the score and the aforementioned recitation.

Release
The miniseries was set to air on TNT, but when Ted Turner saw part of the film during post-production, he realized it was much bigger than a miniseries and decided to release the film theatrically. The film was distributed by New Line Cinema which Turner had just acquired. Only released to 248 theaters at its widest release and limited to just one or two showings per day because of its length, the film still managed to gross $12,769,960 at the box office. It would go on to become an all-time high seller on the VHS and DVD market, and has become a staple of classroom history lessons. Its June 1994 broadcast TV premiere, on TNT, garnered over 34 million viewers, a record for cable TV.

One of the longest films ever released by a Hollywood studio, Gettysburg runs 254 minutes (4 hours, 14 minutes) on VHS and DVD. A "Director's Cut", 271-minute (4 hours, 31 minutes), with several extended or added scenes, was produced and sold as a part of a special "Collector's Edition" released on DVD and Blu-ray in 2011, to coincide with 150th commemoration of beginning of the Civil War in April 1861. It was also released in the UK by the Premium Collection as a DVD and Blu-ray combo which includes the Directors extended version and is number 21 in the collection.

Reception
Gettysburg received a 77% positive rating on the film critics aggregator Rotten Tomatoes, based on 22 reviews. The site's consensus states: "Gettysburgs reverent approach to history is balanced with the committed work of a talented cast - and the hard-hitting dramatization of a bloody turning point in the Civil War."

Roger Ebert of the Chicago Sun-Times gave the film three out of four stars, stating, "This is a film that Civil War buffs will find indispensable, even if others might find it interminable." Ebert said that despite his initial indifference, he left the film with a new understanding of the Civil War, and that he felt Jeff Daniels deserved an Oscar nomination for his performance. Ebert also gave the film a "thumbs-up" on Siskel & Ebert, while Gene Siskel gave it a "thumbs-down", saying the film was "bloated Southern propaganda". He, however, also praised Daniels's performance and recommended his nomination for an Oscar.

Prequel
Gods and Generals, a prequel based on the 1996 novel of the same name by Jeff Shaara (Michael Shaara's son), was released in 2003. It was also written and directed by Ronald F. Maxwell and featured many returning cast members, including Jeff Daniels as Joshua Chamberlain, Kevin Conway as Buster Kilrain, and C. Thomas Howell as Thomas Chamberlain. Stephen Lang, who portrayed George Pickett in the first film, also returned, but in the role of Stonewall Jackson after scheduling conflicts prevented Russell Crowe from taking the part. Billy Campbell, who portrayed Andrew Lewis Pitzer in Gettysburg, replaced Lang as Pickett. New cast members included Robert Duvall as Robert E. Lee, replacing Martin Sheen. 

The film received negative reviews from critics and was a commercial failure, grossing $12.8 million on a $56 million budget.

References

External links

 

1993 films
1993 drama films
1990s historical drama films
1990s war drama films
American Civil War films
American epic films
American historical drama films
American war drama films
Drama films based on actual events
Epic films based on actual events
Films about Christianity
Films based on American novels
Films based on military novels
Films directed by Ronald F. Maxwell
Films scored by Randy Edelman
Films set in 1863
Films set in Pennsylvania
Films shot in Pennsylvania
Gettysburg campaign
Historical epic films
New Line Cinema films
War epic films
War films based on actual events
Films about battles and military operations
1990s English-language films
1990s American films